ACM Conference on Fairness, Accountability, and Transparency (ACM FAccT, formerly known as ACM FAT*) is a peer-reviewed academic conference series about ethics and computing systems. Sponsored by the Association for Computing Machinery, this conference focuses on issues such as algorithmic transparency, fairness in machine learning, bias, and ethics from a multi-disciplinary perspective. The conference community includes computer scientists, statisticians, social scientists, scholars of law, and others.

The conference is sponsored by Big Tech companies such as Facebook, Twitter, and Google, and large foundations such as the Rockefeller Foundation, Ford Foundation, MacArthur Foundation, and Luminate. Sponsors contribute to a general fund (no "earmarked" contributions are allowed) and have no saying in the selection, substance, or structure of the conference.

List of conferences
Past and future FAccT conferences include:

References

External links
 

Computer science conferences
Association for Computing Machinery conferences